A by-election was held for the New South Wales Legislative Assembly electorate of East Macquarie on 1 February 1878 because of the resignation of Sir John Robertson who had also been elected to Mudgee on the same day.

Dates

Result

Sir John Robertson resigned because he had also been elected to Mudgee.

See also
Electoral results for the district of East Macquarie
List of New South Wales state by-elections

References

1878 elections in Australia
New South Wales state by-elections
1870s in New South Wales